In three-dimensional space, a regulus R is a set of skew lines, every point of which is on a transversal which intersects an element of R only once, and such that every point on a transversal lies on a line of R 

The set of transversals of R forms an opposite regulus S. In ℝ3 the union R ∪ S is the ruled surface of a hyperboloid of one sheet.

Three skew lines determine a regulus:
The locus of lines meeting three given skew lines is called a regulus. Gallucci's theorem shows that the lines meeting the generators of the regulus (including the original three lines) form another "associated" regulus, such that every generator of either regulus meets every generator of the other. The two reguli are the two systems of generators of a ruled quadric.

According to Charlotte Scott, "The regulus supplies extremely simple proofs of the properties of a conic...the theorems of Chasles, Brianchon, and Pascal ..."

In a finite geometry PG(3, q), a regulus has q + 1 lines. For example, in 1954 William Edge described a pair of reguli of four lines each in PG(3,3).

Robert J. T. Bell described how the regulus is generated by a moving straight line. First, the hyperboloid  is factored as
 
Then two systems of lines, parametrized by λ and μ satisfy this equation:
 and 

No member of the first set of lines is a member of the second. As λ or μ varies, the hyperboloid is generated. The two sets represent a regulus and its opposite. Using analytic geometry, Bell proves that no two generators in a set intersect, and that any two generators in opposite reguli do intersect and form the plane tangent to the hyperboloid at that point. (page 155).

See also

References

 H. G. Forder (1950) Geometry, page 118, Hutchinson's University Library.

Geometry
Quadrics